Connor Joseph O'Grady (born 5 December 1997) is a football player plays as a defender for Stalybridge Celtic. He has also played for Sheffield Wednesday.

Club career

Sheffield Wednesday
O'Grady signed his first professional contract for Sheffield Wednesday in June 2016.

In August 2016 he made his first team debut for the club, playing the whole game as Wednesday lost to Cambridge United in the first round of the Football League Cup.

Buxton
He then joined Buxton.

Stalybridge Celtic
In May 2021 he joined Stalybridge Celtic.

Career statistics

References

External links

1997 births
Living people
Association football defenders
Sheffield Wednesday F.C. players
English people of Irish descent
Buxton F.C. players
English footballers
Stalybridge Celtic F.C. players